Alessia Vera Schepp and Livia Clara Schepp are missing persons from Saint-Sulpice, a suburb of Lausanne in the canton of Vaud, Switzerland. Matthias Schepp, their father, picked up his twin daughters from his ex-wife's home in St-Sulpice and they never returned. The body of Matthias was later found in Italy, where the authorities presumed that he had committed suicide. The fate of the six-year-old girls has remained unknown since January 30, 2011. Their disappearance led to a police hunt across Switzerland, France and Italy.

Background
Alessia and Livia were twin sisters, born on October 7, 2004. The girls were the only children of Irina Mayme Lucidi Schepp, an Italian-born Swiss lawyer, and Matthias Kaspar Schepp, 43, a Canadian-born Swiss engineer. They married in July 2004 in Ascoli Piceno, Italy. They both worked for the tobacco company Philip Morris.

One year previously the couple had split up, living in the same village, but in separate homes.

Timeline
The following timeline is based on a Swiss Police publication:

 Friday 28 January: Matthias Schepp picks up his daughters to spend the weekend with them.
 Saturday 29 January: Schepp sends an SMS to his wife: "we are all right, we'll return on Monday". 
 Sunday 30 January
 at 12:00: The girls are seen for the last time with Schepp in Saint-Sulpice, Vaud.
 at 17:04: Schepp crosses the border into France.
 Monday 31 January
 at 12:30: Schepp withdraws money from several cashpoints in Marseille.
 Schepp sends a postcard to his wife from Marseille.
 Schepp and the girls take an evening ferry to Propriano, in Corsica.
 Tuesday 1 February
 at 06:30: Schepp disembarks in Propriano, with or without his daughters.
 at 21:00: Schepp takes a ferry from Bastia in northeast Corsica and arrives at Toulon the next morning at 07:00.
 Wednesday 2 February at 09:13: Schepp is photographed alone at a toll.
 Thursday 3 February
 at 12:00: Schepp is observed by a witness in Naples, Italy.
 at 22:47: Schepp throws himself under a train at Cerignola, in the south-east Italian region of Apulia.

Possible murder by Matthias Schepp
In February 2011 police investigators said that Schepp sent a letter to his wife suggesting that he had killed the children.  The letter was not released to the public.  According to CNN, the Italian newspaper Corriere della Sera was allowed to publish a single sentence from the letters which said "The children rest in peace, they have not suffered".  A search of Schepp's computer showed that in the days leading up to the trip, he searched for information about firearms and poisons, along with the timetables for the ferry.

Novelization 
In 2015, Italian journalist and writer Concita De Gregorio published a novel, Mi sa che fuori è primavera, based on the girls' disappearance, written from the point of view of Irina Lucidi. De Gregorio received a Brancati Prize for the book in 2016. It was published in English in 2022 as The Missing Word.

See also

 2011 in Switzerland
 List of people who disappeared
 Missing Children Switzerland (in French)

References

External links
Interpol Notice
Interpol Notice for Livia Clara Schepp
Interpol Notice for Alessia Vera Schepp

2010s missing person cases
2011 in Switzerland
January 2011 events in Europe
Canton of Vaud
Incidents of violence against girls
Kidnapped Swiss children
Missing people
Missing person cases in Switzerland
Swiss twins